Richard Collingbourne (died 1418) was the member of the Parliament of England for Marlborough for the parliament of 1402.

He was escheator in 1403 and obtained a royal pardon for any offenses carried out in that role.

References 

Members of Parliament for Marlborough
English MPs 1402
15th-century English politicians
Year of birth unknown
1418 deaths
Escheators